Refuge du Cuchet is a French refuge in the Alps located in Vanoise National Park, Savoie.

Mountain huts in the Alps
Geography of Savoie
Mountain huts in France